Canoe Lake 165B is an Indian reserve of the Canoe Lake Cree First Nation in Saskatchewan. It is 22 miles southwest of Île-à-la-Crosse.

References

Indian reserves in Saskatchewan
Division No. 18, Saskatchewan